Damia Elizabeth Cortaza Giménez (born 29 September 1993) is a Paraguayan footballer who plays as a midfielder for Libertad/Limpeño and the Paraguay women's national team.

International goals
Scores and results list Paraguay's goal tally first

Honours

Club
Sportivo Limpeño
Copa Libertadores Femenina: 2016

References

1993 births
Living people
Women's association football midfielders
Paraguayan women's footballers
Paraguay women's international footballers
Pan American Games competitors for Paraguay
Footballers at the 2019 Pan American Games
Paraguayan women's futsal players